A Colonial Surgeon was a medical official in the British Empire. Colonial Surgeons were sometimes part of the government of British colonies, for instance in British Honduras where the Colonial Surgeon was a member of the Executive Council. Daniel Robertson was Colonial Secretary and Acting Governor of the Gambia in the mid-nineteenth century. Samuel Rowe was twice governor of Sierra Leone and held several other senior positions.

List of Colonial Surgeons
 Peter Daniel Anthonisz (Southern Province, Sri Lanka)
 James Bowman (New South Wales)
 Albert John Chalmers (Gold Coast)
 Robert Michael Forde (Gambia)
 Samuel Hamilton (British Honduras)
 William Mayhew (Western Australia)
 Daniel Robertson (Gambia)
 Samuel Rowe (Gold Coast)
 Isaac Scott Nind (New South Wales)
 Robert Smith (Sierra Leone)
 John Macaulay Wilson (Sierra Leone)

See also
 Colonial Surgeon (South Australia)
 List of Indian Medical Service officers

References 

British Empire-related lists
Lists of physicians
Medicine in the British Empire
Colonial Surgeons